Hakan Fidan (born 1968) is a former Turkish Armed Forces officer and diplomat who is the 17th and current director of the National Intelligence Organization. His previous tenures included executive positions at the Prime Minister's office, Turkish Cooperation and Coordination Agency, and the Ministry of Foreign Affairs. Internationally, Fidan held board positions at two specialized agencies of the United Nations; the International Atomic Energy Agency (IAEA) and the United Nations Industrial Development Organization (UNIDO).

Career
After a first degree in management and political sciences at University of Maryland University College he got master's thesis and PhD thesis, both from Bilkent University. He was a non-commissioned officer in the Turkish Army from 1986 to 2001. He was the head of the Turkish Development and Cooperation Agency from 2003 to 2007. In November 2007 he was appointed as a deputy-undersecretary in the Prime Ministry and became the security advisor for Recep Tayyip Erdogan.

National Intelligence Organization 
From May 2010 to February 2015, he was the undersecretary (i.e. chief) of the National Intelligence Organization (MİT). On 7 February  2015, he resigned from his position to run for the Turkish Grand National Assembly from the Justice and Development Party (AKP). One month later, on 9 March 2015, he withdrew his candidacy and hours later was reappointed to his former job by the Government.

Foreign relations 
His tenure saw a shift from a security cooperation with Israel and the United States towards one with Iran most notably Qasem Soleimani, the leader of the Al Quds division.  During the Munich Security Conference in February 2017, he delivered a list of 300 alleged supporters of the Gülen Movement to Bruno Kahl, president of the German Federal Intelligence Service in apparent expectation of cooperation. But the list much more lead the German authorities to warn the observed people from the Turkish intelligence service activities. In September 2022, he visited Hamis Hancer of the Sunni bloc in the Iraqi Parliament in Baghdad and also met with the Iraqi President Baram Salih.

Controversies 
He was involved in secret peace talks with the Kurdistan Workers' Party (PKK) for which in 2012 a state prosecutor wanted to investigate him. Recep Tayyip Erdoğan intervened on behalf of Fidan and he was later delegated to hold talks with Abdullah Öcalan and arranged the secret black marketing of Iran through Recep Tayyip Erdoğan's government.

References

External links
 

1968 births
Living people
People from Ankara
People of the National Intelligence Organization (Turkey)
Directors of intelligence agencies
Turkish non-commissioned personnel
University of Maryland Global Campus alumni
Bilkent University alumni
20th-century Turkish people
21st-century Turkish people
Date of birth missing (living people)